Alejandro Chabán (born Alejandro José Chabán Rodríguez on August 20, 1981), is a Venezuelan actor, television host, author and certified consultant on nutrition and wellness. Chaban has participated in several Latin American telenovelas and series.  He also lent his voice for the video game, L.A. Noire, as "Gabriel Delgado".

Filmography

References

External links 

1981 births
Living people
Venezuelan male telenovela actors
People from Maturín
Venezuelan male television actors
21st-century Venezuelan male actors